Port-Royal National Historic Site (originally built 1605–1613) is a National Historic Site located on the north bank of the Annapolis Basin in the community of Port Royal, Nova Scotia, Canada. The site is the location of the Habitation at Port-Royal.

The Habitation at Port-Royal was established by France in 1605 and was that nation's first permanent settlement in North America, as although Fort Charlesbourg-Royal in the future Quebec City had been built in 1541, it did not last long. Port-Royal served as the capital of Acadia until its destruction by British military forces in 1613.

The relocated settlement kept the same name of Port-Royal and served as the capital of Acadia for the majority of the 17th century until the 1710 British conquest of the colony, at which time the settlement was renamed Annapolis Royal.

Replica construction in 1939

On May 25, 1925, the national Historic Sites and Monuments Board recognized the original Habitation at Port-Royal in the community of Port Royal, Nova Scotia for its heritage significance, and the then Minister of the Interior Charles Stewart designated it Port-Royal National Historic Site.

In the 1930s the approximate site of the original Habitation was located in the community and the results of archaeological excavations fed public interest in the period of the original French settlement. This interest had been increasing since the publication of Quietly My Captain Waits, an historical novel by the Canadian novelist Evelyn Eaton set in Port-Royal in the early 17th century.

In the early 1900s, chiefly under the leadership of Harriette Taber Richardson, a native of Cambridge, Massachusetts, and summer resident of the nearby town of Annapolis Royal, Nova Scotian preservationists and historians began lobbying the Government of Canada to build a replica of the Habitation which stood from 1605 until its destruction in 1613.

The government agreed, after much persuasion, to have the replica built on the original site. Construction took place from 1939-1941 and was based on a duplicate set of plans for the original Habitation that had been recently discovered in France.  This was the first National Historic Site to have a replica structure built.

Today, this replica serves as the cornerstone of Port-Royal National Historic Site, and, coupled with nearby Fort Anne National Historic Site in Annapolis Royal, continues to commemorate this important historic region for visitors. Today, the replica of the Habitation is considered a milestone in the national heritage movement. Operated by Parks Canada, it is open to the public as a unit of the national park system, staffed by historical interpreters in period costumes, and is a major tourist attraction. Costumed interpreters provide demonstrations of such historic early 17th-century activities as farming, building, cooking, fur trading and Mi'kmaq life.

Original settlement of Port-Royal (1605–13)

Port-Royal was founded by the French nobleman Pierre Du Gua de Monts, who spent a disastrous winter in Île-Saint-Croix. He was accompanied by Samuel de Champlain, Louis Hébert (this is disputed in the French archives which indicate Hébert did not sail until 1606) and Jean de Biencourt de Poutrincourt et de Saint-Just.  They decided to move their settlement to the north shore of the present-day Annapolis Basin, a sheltered bay on the south shore of the Bay of Fundy that had been recorded by Champlain earlier in the spring of 1605 during a coastal reconnaissance. Champlain noted in his journals that the bay was of impressive size; he believed it would be an adequate anchorage for several hundred ships of the French Royal Fleet, if ever necessary. As such, he named the basin "Port-Royal", the Royal Port; this was, for many years, the name of both the body of water and of the subsequent French settlements in that region.  Poutrincourt asked King Henri IV to become the owner of the seigneurie that encompassed the settlement.

Nestled against the North Mountain range, they set about constructing a log stockade fortification called a "habitation."  With assistance from members of the Mi'kmaq Nation and a local chief named Membertou, coupled with the more temperate climate of the fertile Annapolis Valley, the settlement prospered.

Mindful of the disastrous winter of 1604–05 at the Île-Saint-Croix settlement, Champlain established l'Ordre de Bon Temps (the Order of Good Cheer) as a social club ostensibly to promote better nutrition and to get settlers through the winter of 1606–07.  Supper every few days became a feast with a festive air supplemented by performances and alcohol and was primarily attended by the prominent men of the colony and their Mi'kmaq neighbours while the Mi'kmaq women, children, and poorer settlers looked on and were offered scraps. Marc Lescarbot's "The Theatre of Neptune in New France", the first work of theater written and performed in North America, was performed on November 14, 1606. It was arguably the catalyst for the Order of Good Cheer.

In 1607, Dugua had his fur trade monopoly revoked by the Government of France, forcing settlers to return to France that fall. The Habitation was left in the care of Membertou and the local Mi'kmaq until 1610 when Sieur de Poutrincourt, another French nobleman, returned with a small expedition to Port-Royal.  Poutrincourt converted Membertou and local Mi'kmaq to Catholicism, hoping to gain financial assistance from the government. As a result, Jesuits became financial partners with Poutrincourt, although this caused division within the community.

In May, 1613 the Jesuits moved on to the Penobscot River valley and in July, the settlement was attacked by Samuel Argall of Virginia.  Argall returned in November that same year and burned the Habitation to the ground while settlers were away nearby.  Poutrincourt returned from France in spring 1614 to find Port-Royal in ruins and settlers living with the Mi'kmaq.  Poutrincourt then gave his holdings to his son and returned to France.  Poutrincourt's son bequeathed the settlement to Charles de Saint-Étienne de la Tour upon his own death in 1623.

Port-Royal was the capital of Acadia from 1605 to 1710. Initially Port-Royal was located on the north shore of the Annapolis Basin in the present-day community of Port Royal (note the Anglophone spelling), which is the site of the replica reconstruction of the original Habitation at Port-Royal. The British renamed Port-Royal at this new location as Annapolis Royal following their conquest of Acadia in 1710.

Port-Royal was founded by Pierre Dugua, Sieur de Mons and Samuel de Champlain in 1605. The settlement was the first permanent European settlement north of St. Augustine, Florida. (Two years later, the English made their first permanent settlement in Jamestown, Virginia.)  Approximately seventy-five years after Port-Royal was founded, Acadians spread out from the capital to found the other major Acadian settlements established before the Expulsion of the Acadians: Grand-Pré, Chignecto, Cobequid and Pisiguit.

In the 150 years prior to the founding of Halifax in 1749, Port-Royal/Annapolis Royal was the capital of Acadia and later Nova Scotia for most decades. During that time the British made six attempts to conquer Acadia by attacking the capital at Port-Royal (present day Annapolis Royal, Nova Scotia. They finally defeated the French in 1710 following the Siege of Port-Royal. Over the following fifty years, the French and their allies made six unsuccessful military attempts to regain the capital. Including a raid by Americans in the American Revolution, Port-Royal (at present-day Annapolis Royal) faced a total of thirteen attacks, more than any other place in North America.

Pierre Dugua, Sieur de Monts built the Habitation at Port-Royal in 1605 as a replacement for his initial attempt at colonizing Saint Croix Island in the Saint Croix River on the boundary between present-day Maine and New Brunswick. The trading monopoly of de Monts was cancelled in 1607, and most of the French settlers returned to France, although some remained with the natives. Jean de Biencourt de Poutrincourt et de Saint-Just led a second expedition to Port-Royal in 1610.

Port-Royal was the site of a number of North American firsts: the first resident surgeon; first continuing church services; first social club (named the "Order of Good Cheer"); creation of the first library; first French theatrical performance (titled Neptune); first apothecary; and first weekly Bible class. The author of Neptune, Marc Lescarbot, wrote a popular history of his time in New France, entitled Histoire de la Nouvelle-France (1609).

Battle of Port Royal (1613)
Almost ten years later, the Admiral of Virginia Samuel Argall led an English invasion force from Virginia to attack Acadia.  He began with the Saint-Saveur mission (Mount Desert Island, Maine) and then St. Croix Island.  In October 1613, Argall surprised the settlers at Port-Royal and sacked every building. The battle destroyed the Habitation but it did not wipe out the colony.  Biencourt and his men remained in the area of Port-Royal (present day Port Royal, Nova Scotia). A mill upstream at present day Lequille, Nova Scotia remained, along with settlers who went into hiding during the battle. Charles La Tour was one of the men who stayed behind.  They eventually left Port-Royal and settled by 1620, at Cape Negro- Cape Sable. (At this time, future Governor Charles de Saint-Étienne de la Tour migrated from Port-Royal to establish himself at both Cap de Sable (present-day Port La Tour, Nova Scotia) and Saint John, New Brunswick.

See also

Military history of Nova Scotia
History of Nova Scotia
History of Acadia
Royal eponyms in Canada
Monarchy in Nova Scotia
Canadian Register of Historic Places
Former colonies and territories in Canada
History of Canada
List of National Historic Sites of Canada

References
Notes

Citations

Primary sources

 Samuel de Champlain, Les Fondations de l'Acadie et de Québec. 1604-1611, Québec: Septentrion, 2008
 Eric Thierry, La France de Henri IV en Amérique du Nord. De la création de l'Acadie à la fondation de Québec, Paris: Honoré CHampion, 2008.

Secondary sources

 
 
 
 
 
Parks Canada, Port Royal National Historic Site brochure, undated (2001 ?).

External links

 Port-Royal National Historic Site
 Censuses of Canada - 1665 to 1871 - Early French Settlements
 Saint Croix Island International Historic Site
 An Essay on Port Royal
 
  Photographs of historic plaques at the Port Royal Habitation National Historic Site, Nova Scotia
  Photographs of the Scotch Fort historic monument at Port Royal, Nova Scotia
 Nova Scotia Archives and Records Management
  Port Royal/Annapolis Royal Timeline
 Jean Pitre circa 1635

Acadian history
Mi'kmaq in Canada
History museums in Nova Scotia
Museums in Annapolis County, Nova Scotia
Open-air museums in Canada
Buildings and structures in Annapolis County, Nova Scotia
National Historic Sites in Nova Scotia
1605 establishments in New France
1600s in Canada
1613 disestablishments in New France
Populated places established in 1605
Populated places disestablished in the 17th century